There have been a number of 18-inch torpedoes in service with the United Kingdom.

These have been used on ships of the Royal Navy and aircraft of both the Fleet Air Arm and Royal Air Force, while Royal Navy surface ships and submarines use 21-inch torpedoes.

45 cm "Fiume" (Whitehead) torpedo 

First introduced into British service in 1894.
 Year : about 1888
 Weight : 
 Length : 
 Warhead :  wet gun-cotton
 Performance :  for 
 Propulsion : Compressed air

Mark V 
Used on the River-class and 1905 Tribal-class destroyers.

 Year : about 1899
 Weight : 
 Warhead :  including pistol
 Propulsion : Compressed air

Mark VI 
Used on destroyers of the early 1900s.

 Year : about 1904
 Propulsion : Compressed air

Mark VII and VII* 
Introduced on the 1908 members of the 1905 Tribal class destroyers. Used by torpedo boats built before the First World War and destroyers. Used by RAF flying boats in the 1920s.

 Year : 1907
 Warhead :  TNT
 Performance :
 Propulsion : Wet-heater

Mark VIII 
 Year: 1913
 Role: Submarines and aircraft (Note: During World War II and after the Mk.VIII was a 21-inch torpedo)
 Warhead:  TNT
 Propulsion: Wet heater
 Performance:  for

Mark XI 
 Year: 1934
 Aircraft carried
 Dimensions:  dia.
 Warhead:  TNT
 Propulsion: Burner cycle
 Performance:  for

Mark XII 

Aircraft launched, used by Fleet Air Arm and RAF Coastal Command.

Mark XIV 

The Mark XIV was an aircraft-launched torpedo. Stocks were lost with the fall of Singapore.

Mark XV 

 Year: 1942
 Operators: Fleet Air Arm, RAF Coastal Command, Royal Navy
 Role: Aircraft and Motor Torpedo Boats, 1943 onwards
 Dimensions:  × 
 Warhead:  Torpex
 Propulsion: Burner cycle

Mark XVI 
Electric torpedo project not completed.

Mark XVII 
 United Kingdom, 1944
 Aircraft launched
 Operated by FAA, RAF Coastal Command, Blackburn Firebrand
 Dimensions:  × 
 Warhead:  Torpex
 Propulsion: Burner cycle
 Performance:  for

Mark 30 

An air-dropped passive acoustic homing torpedo known as "Dealer" and "Dealer B".

 Length: 
 Weight: 

See also 
 List of torpedoes
 British 21-inch torpedo

Notes

References 
 Tony DiGiulian, Pre Second World War torpedoes
 Tony DiGiulian, Torpedoes of the Second World War

External links 

Torpedoes of the United Kingdom